Stephen, Steven or Steve Gunn may refer to:
 Stephen K. Gunn (born 1954), Canadian businessman
 Stephen Gunn Oxford historian
 Steve Gunn (ice hockey) (1890–1914), ice hockey player
 Steve Gunn (musician), New York guitarist and singer-songwriter
 Steve Gunn, DJ on Timeless satellite ratio station